Princess Joséphine-Charlotte of Belgium (11 October 1927 – 10 January 2005), was the Grand Duchess of Luxembourg as the wife of Grand Duke Jean. She was the first child of King Leopold III of Belgium, and sister of the late King Baudouin and former King Albert II and aunt of King Philippe. She was also the first cousin of King Harald V of Norway, second cousin of Margrethe II of Denmark, and a maternal third cousin of Queen Elizabeth II.

Childhood

Joséphine-Charlotte was born in 1927 at the Royal Palace of Brussels. She was the oldest child and only daughter of the King Leopold III of Belgium and his first wife, Princess Astrid of Sweden. She was christened a month after her birth. Her godfather was her uncle, Prince Charles, Count of Flanders and her godmother was her future mother-in-law, Grand Duchess Charlotte of Luxembourg.

While expecting her daughter, Astrid had read a biography of her ancestress, the French empress Joséphine de Beauharnais. Josephine was also the name of one of the child's great-aunts, Princess Joséphine-Caroline of Belgium, the dearest sister of King Albert I. Astrid was a devoted mother to her "little Jo".
The young Princess spent her childhood at the Stuyvenberg Palace just outside Brussels with her parents. She was the sister of Belgian monarchs Baudouin and Albert II.

Joséphine-Charlotte's mother was killed in an automobile accident in 1935 when Joséphine-Charlotte was nearly eight. The Belgian public extended their enormous sympathies onto the grieving family, with great concern given to the effects it had on Joséphine-Charlotte and her brothers. King Leopold remained a devoted father to his children and kept close ties with his late wife's family. Many photographs exist from this time of the children with their Swedish grandparents and Norwegian cousins. Later, in 1941, her father remarried to Mary Lilian Baels (later became Princess of Réthy). This marriage produced three more children: Prince Alexandre (who was also Joséphine-Charlotte's godson), Princess Marie-Christine and Princess Marie-Esméralda. Joséphine-Charlotte and her siblings had a close relationship with their stepmother and they called her "Mother".

Education

Joséphine-Charlotte first attended school at the Royal Palace, where a small class had been organized for her. She and her brothers went through a short period of exodus in France and Spain just after the surrender in 1940. At the end of 1940, she entered the Boarding School of the Faithful Virgin in Brussels and studied there until 1942. After that, she continued her education with her own private teachers at the Royal Palace of Laeken, where her family was held prisoner. On 7 June 1944, the day after the Allied Forces landed in Normandy, France, she and her father were sent to Germany and kept there under house arrest. The Royal Family, which included her brothers Baudouin and Albert, her half-brother Alexandre, and their stepmother Princess Lilian, was freed on 7 May 1945 and settled in Prégny, Switzerland until 1950.

Joséphine-Charlotte continued her studies at École Supérieure de Jeunes Filles in Geneva. There, she took courses in French literature, English, history and chemistry. Afterwards, she took Jean Piaget's lectures on child psychology at the University of Geneva.

Adulthood 
On 11 April 1949, Joséphine-Charlotte returned to Belgium for the first time since the war from Luxembourg. A few months earlier, she expressed her desire to return to Belgium during the presentation of a gift from the Belgian delegation of the Dames de la Résistance. In Bastogne, she visited Bastogne's Town Hall, the war memorial and Mardasson Memorial. She also visited Bande, Marche and Namur before reaching Brussels, where she stayed at the Royal Palace of Laeken with her grandmother, Queen Elisabeth.

On 13 April 1949, Joséphine-Charlotte visited Lichtervelde and La Panne before returning to Brussels to participate in the Holy Thursday mass in Mechelen. On 16 April, the Princess left Brussels and stayed at Fischbach Castle in Luxembourg for a few days before returning to Switzerland. She returned to Belgium again to vote in the referendum on 12 March 1950, which ended up with the result of the maintenance of the monarchy in Belgium. When she returned to Belgium, the princess took up her official duties. At the same time, she also devoted herself to social problems and developed her interest in the arts.

Marriage
Joséphine-Charlotte met Jean, Grand Duke of Luxembourg for the first time during one of her short stays with her godmother and future mother-in-law, Grand Duchess Charlotte, in Fischbach in 1948. On 26 December 1952, the couple announced their engagement to the public even though they were already engaged the previous month. Joséphine-Charlotte and Jean were joined in marriage on 9 April 1953 in Luxembourg. During their 52-year marriage, the couple had five children:

Princess Marie-Astrid of Luxembourg (b. 17 February 1954)
Henri, Grand Duke of Luxembourg (b. 16 April 1955)
Prince Jean of Luxembourg (b. 15 May 1957)
Princess Margaretha of Luxembourg (b. 15 May 1957)
Prince Guillaume of Luxembourg (b. 1 May 1963)

Grand Duchess 

As a Belgian princess, Joséphine-Charlotte brought a wealth of elegance, taste and refinement to her new homeland. She carried out many social, cultural and humanitarian duties. She focused on several initiatives that she would ardently support, particularly matters pertaining to children and families. After the accession of Grand Duke Jean in 1964, the Grand Ducal family, who initially lived at Betzdorf Castle, moved to the Berg Castle. Grand Duchess Joséphine-Charlotte actively involved in the renovation of the castle.

 
As Grand Duchess, she often accompanied her husband on foreign visits, as well as many events within Luxembourg itself. She and the Grand Duke made numerous state visits such as to the Vatican and Brazil in 1965, the United Kingdom in 1972, USSR and Tunisia in 1975, Senegal in 1977, China in 1979, and the United States in 1984. During her tenure as a consort, she and her husband hosted 39 state visits to Luxembourg.

Joséphine-Charlotte became president of the Luxembourg Red Cross in 1964. She was president of Luxembourg Youth Section of the Red Cross. She also served as honorary president of the Luxembourg Philharmonic Orchestra. She became the chief guide of Luxembourg’s guides movement in 1990. She was the patron of the Union of Voluntary Blood Donors and the Luxembourg Paediatrics Society. The Grand Duchess also oversaw the restoration of the Grand Ducal Palace from 1991 until 1996. She became a patron and honorary president of l’association pour la protection curative de l’enfance, the Scouts and Guides of Luxembourg,  the Equestrian Federation, les Jeunesses musicales, the International Bazaar of Luxembourg and the Hëllef fir kriibskrank Kanner Foundation. She also regularly visited Luxembourg's social and cultural centers, establishments, institutes, hospitals and nurseries.

Beside secular organizations, Joséphine-Charlotte supports religious institutions such as Action Catholique des Femmes du Luxembourg (ACFL) of which she became a patron.

Hobbies 
Grand Duchess Joséphine-Charlotte's favorite hobbies included gardening and horticulture. She also enjoyed hunting, fishing, skiing and other watersports. The Grand Duchess also enjoyed collecting works of modern art. In 2003, the exhibition named De Manessier à Wim Delvoye presented 108 works from the private collection of the Grand Duchess at the National Museum of History and Art in Luxembourg.

Death 
The Grand Duchess, who suffered from lung cancer for a long time, died at her home, Fischbach Castle, at the age of 77.

Legacy
Joséphine-Charlotte metro station in Brussels is named after her.
One of her wedding gifts was a diamond tiara, commonly known as the Belgian Scroll Tiara, given by the Société Générale. This is now part of the Luxembourg reigning family's jewel collection. 

On 5 December 2016, a remembrance concert in honour of Grand Duchess Joséphine-Charlotte was held in Luxembourg. The concert was performed by Vienna Philharmonic Orchestra and directed by Tugan Sokhiev while Rudolf Buchbinder performed on the piano.

Honours

National
 : Knight Grand Cross of the Order of Leopold
 : Knight Grand Cross of the Order of the Gold Lion of the House of Nassau
 : Knight Grand Cross of the Order of Adolphe of Nassau

Foreign
 : Knight of the Order of the Elephant
 : Grand Cross Special Class of the Order of Merit of the Federal Republic of Germany
  Greek Royal Family: Dame 1st Class of the Royal Order of Saints Olga and Sophia
 : Dame Grand Cross of the Order of the Falcon
  Iranian Imperial Family: Recipient of the Commemorative Medal of the 2,500 year Celebration of the Persian Empire
 : Dame of the Decoration of Honour
 : Bailiff Dame Grand Cross in Obedience of the Sovereign Military Order of Malta
 : Dame Grand Cordon (Paulownia) of the Order of the Precious Crown
 : Dame Grand Cross of the Order of the Netherlands Lion
 : Recipient of the Wedding Medal of Beatrix, Princess of Orange and Claus van Amsberg
 : Dame Grand Cross of the Order of St. Olav
 : Dame Grand Cross of the Order of Christ
 : Dame Grand Cross of the Order of Isabella the Catholic
 : Member of the Royal Order of the Seraphim  (12 September 1983)  
 : Recipient of the 50th Birthday Badge Medal of King Carl XVI Gustaf (30 April 1996)
 : Dame Grand Cross of the Order of Chula Chom Klao
 : Recipient of the Queen Elizabeth II Coronation Medal

Ancestry

References

External links

|-

Grand Ducal Consorts of Luxembourg
Belgian princesses
Princesses of Saxe-Coburg and Gotha
House of Belgium
House of Nassau-Weilburg
Deaths from lung cancer
Deaths from cancer in Luxembourg
Nobility from Brussels
1927 births
2005 deaths
Burials at Notre-Dame Cathedral, Luxembourg

Grand Crosses Special Class of the Order of Merit of the Federal Republic of Germany
Knights Grand Cross of the Order of the Falcon
Dames of Malta
Grand Crosses of the Order of Christ (Portugal)
Dames Grand Cross of the Order of Isabella the Catholic
Dames Grand Cross of the Order of Chula Chom Klao
Belgian people of Swedish descent
Daughters of kings